The Regulating Act of 1773 created the office with the title of Governor-General of Presidency of Fort William, or Governor-General of Bengal to be appointed by the Court of Directors of the East India Company (EIC). The Court of Directors assigned a Council of Four (based in India) to assist the Governor-General, and the decision of the council was binding on the Governor-General during 1773–1784.

The Saint Helena Act 1833 (or Government of India Act 1833) re-designated the office with the title of Governor-General of India. Lord William Bentinck was first to be designated as the Governor-general of India in 1833.

After the Indian Rebellion of 1857, the company rule was brought to an end, but the British India along with princely states came under the direct rule of the British Crown. The Government of India Act 1858 created the office of Secretary of State for India in 1858 to oversee the affairs of India, which was advised by a new Council of India with 15 members (based in London). The existing Council of Four was formally renamed as the Council of Governor-General of India or Executive Council of India. The Council of India was later abolished by Government of India Act 1935.

Following the adoption of the Government of India Act of 1858, the Governor-General representing the Crown became known as the Viceroy. The designation 'Viceroy', although it was most frequently used in ordinary parlance, had no statutory authority, and was never employed by Parliament. Although the Proclamation of 1858 announcing the assumption of the government of India by the Crown referred to Lord Canning as "first Viceroy and Governor-General", none of the Warrants appointing his successors referred to them as 'Viceroys', and the title, which was frequently used in Warrants dealing with precedence and in public notifications, was one of ceremony used in connection with the state and social functions of the Sovereign's representative. The Governor-General continued to be the sole representative of the Crown, and the Government of India continued to be vested in the appointments of Governor-General of India which were made by the British Crown upon the advice of Secretary of State for India. The office of Governor-General continued to exist as a ceremonial post in each of the new dominions of India and Pakistan, until they adopted republican constitutions in 1950 and 1956 respectively.

List of governors-general

Notes

See also
 List of governors of Bengal Presidency
 Council of India
 Secretary of State for India
 List of presidents of India
 Governor-general

Citations

India, List of Governors-General of
Governors-General
British India-related lists